Theodor Capitani von Kurnatowski (born March 19, 1980), known professionally as Theo Von, is an American stand-up comedian, podcaster, television personality, YouTuber, and actor. He is the host of the This Past Weekend podcast and former co-host of The King and the Sting podcast.

Early life and education 
Von was born to Gina Capitani and Roland Theodor Achilles von Kurnatowski, who was originally from Bluefields, Nicaragua; Von claims his father was 70 years old when he was born. He died from cancer when Von was 16 years old. Von grew up in Covington, Louisiana, with his older brother and two younger sisters. Von was legally emancipated at 14. 

He graduated from Mandeville High School in Mandeville, Louisiana. He attended Louisiana State University for a time, as well as Loyola University New Orleans, University of Arizona, College of Charleston, and Santa Monica College. Von received his undergraduate degree in 2011 from the University of New Orleans.

Career

Television and film

2000–2008: Reality television 

Von began a professional career in entertainment at age nineteen when he starred in MTV's Road Rules: Maximum Velocity Tour in 2000. He was recruited to the show while studying at Louisiana State University.

Following his season of Road Rules, Von was on four seasons of MTV's reality game show The Challenge, formerly known as Real World/Road Rules Challenge. The show was a spinoff of MTV's The Real World and Road Rules. He was part of the cast of the seasons Battle of the Seasons (2002), The Gauntlet (2003–2004), Battle of the Sexes II (2004–2005), and Fresh Meat (2006). Von was runner-up in 2002 and won the following two seasons. 

In 2006, Von competed on season 4 of Last Comic Standing where he won the online competition. 

In mid-2008, he was a member of the Comedy Central sketch/competition show Reality Bites Back. He won the show, beating out fellow comedians including Amy Schumer, Bert Kreischer, and Tiffany Haddish.

2012–present: Game show host and acting
Beginning in 2011, Von took over as a host of the popular Yahoo online TV recap show Primetime in No Time. He hosted the TBS hidden camera show Deal With It, executive produced by Howie Mandel, for its run of three seasons from 2013 to 2014.

During this period, Von began appearing in cameo acting roles in a few television shows including Inside Amy Schumer and Why? with Hannibal Buress. He has said that he was not more interested in acting earlier on, despite having opportunities to do pilots and sitcoms, because he was not excited about particular projects and they often conflicted with his touring and podcasting schedules.

In the spring of 2018, Von's three-episode scripted comedy show Man Up was released on Comedy Central. In August 2019, Von announced that he had been cast in the big-budget film The Tomorrow War (at the time known as Ghost Draft) and had been recruited to the project by its star Chris Pratt. A few weeks later, Von announced on his podcast that he had dropped out of the movie due to the time commitment.

Stand-up 
Von began performing stand-up comedy as a young man in Louisiana. At age 23, after his tenure on MTV, he decided to move to Los Angeles and professionally pursue stand-up. For some time, he had difficulty as an entertainer in Hollywood as talent agents would not give him a chance, viewing him as a reality TV star. It took years to shake this image and establish himself as a comedian.

Von achieved one of his first major comedic accomplishments a few years later in 2006 when he won the title of Fan Favorite on the online competition aligned with the fourth season of Last Comic Standing. Around this time, Von began touring his set nationally. He also took part in five international tours for the USO which included performing at Guantanamo Bay.

In 2009, Von popularized "crank texting" (sending a text message to random phone numbers to incite conversations), and began his "crank texting" blog, which was picked up as a column by CollegeHumor a year later.

On June 1, 2012, Von was the featured comedian in an episode of Comedy Central's The Half Hour, now known as Comedy Central Stand-Up Presents. He also promoted his comedy on The Arsenio Hall Show, Hello Ross, Chelsea Lately, Watch What Happens Live, @midnight, and This Is Not Happening, among other television shows. In 2016, Netflix released Von's debut hour-long comedy special No Offense. The show was taped at the Civic Theatre in New Orleans, Louisiana. In the summer of 2019, Von embarked on a three-month national tour called The Dark Arts Tour.

Podcasting 
As of 2023, Von hosts a single podcast, This Past Weekend, and was a former host of the podcast King and The Sting (and Wing). He has been a recurring guest on many comedians' podcasts, including The Joe Rogan Experience, Joey Diaz's The Church of What’s Happening Now, The Fighter and the Kid, and Bobby Lee's TigerBelly.

2011–2015: Early ventures 
In April 2011, Von began his first podcast, The Comedy Sideshow. Taped at the Improv Comedy Club in Hollywood, Von would interview comedians and other entertainers. The show had twenty-three episodes, the last of which premiered in November of that year.

In 2015, Von started a weekly podcast with filmmaker/journalist Matthew Cole Weiss called Allegedly with Theo Von & Matthew Cole Weiss. The two totally opposite friends competed to see who had better "alleged" tales of celebrities, hilarity, trauma, dating, success, and failure from their years living in Hollywood. The podcast lasted three years and had a total of 123 episodes.

2016–present: This Past Weekend and King and The Sting 
Von began a new podcast in December 2016, This Past Weekend. This is a long-form video podcast which features Von storytelling, answering fan voicemails, and doing thoughtful guest interviews. He released his 200th episode in May 2019.

In December 2018, Von and fellow podcaster Brendan Schaub started a new podcast called King and The Sting. At the podcast's release, it debuted at number 1 on the iTunes Podcast charts in the US and also reached the top charts in the United Kingdom, Canada, Spain, and Australia.

In January 2022, Schaub and Von added a third host, Chris D'Elia, to King and The Sting, renaming it to King and The Sting and Wing. During this time Von began taking breaks from the podcast, allowing guest-hosts to fill in. On November 4, 2022, King and The Sting and Wing was officially renamed The Golden Hour, with Workaholics actor Erik Griffin replacing Von.

Personal life
Von has lived in Nashville, Tennessee since September 2020.

Appearances in media

Comedy specials and albums 

 No Offense (Netflix, 2016)
 30lb Bag of Hamster Bones (2017 album) - on March 6 it placed #1 on the iTunes Comedy Album charts and #4 on Billboard.
 Regular People (Netflix, 2021)

Podcasts 

 The Comedy Sideshow (2011)
 Allegedly with Theo Von & Matthew Cole Weiss (2015–2018)
 This Past Weekend (2016–present)
 King and The Sting (and Wing) (with Brendan Schaub (2018–2022)

Filmography

References

Selected work

External links

21st-century American comedians
1980 births
American male comedians
American people of British descent
American people of Italian descent
American people of Nicaraguan descent
American people of Polish descent
American podcasters
American stand-up comedians
Comedians from Louisiana
Living people
Road Rules cast members
The Challenge (TV series) contestants
University of New Orleans alumni